Rocky Creek is an unincorporated community in Hillsborough County, Florida,  United States.  Although a separate community, it is a part of the census-designated place (CDP) of Town 'n' Country. The ZIP code for the community is 33615.

Geography
Rocky Creek is located at 28° 0' 15" north, 82° 34' 47" west (28.004, -82.57972); or approximately eight miles northwest of Tampa. The elevation for the community is three feet above sea level.

Education
The community of Rocky Creek is served by Hillsborough County Schools.

See also
Unincorporated communities in Florida

References

External links
Rocky Creek Village
Rocky Creek profile from Hometown Locator

Unincorporated communities in Hillsborough County, Florida
Unincorporated communities in Florida